Kikhchik is a former urban-type settlement in Ust-Bolsheretsky District, Kamchatka Krai, Far East Russia. It lies on the southwest coast of the Kamchatka Peninsula on the Sea of Okhotsk. Established in 1926 on the river Kikhchik, a fish canning factory was built by the Soviets here and it attained town status in 1940. Kikhchik had a secondary school, two elementary schools, a hospital, a club, a nursery, a kindergarten, three libraries, a canteen, a bakery, a bathhouse, 6 shops and 3 stalls, and an agricultural farm. By 1959 it had a population of 2606, which had declined to 709 by 1970. On August 28, 1972, the settlement of Kikhchik was abandoned.

References

Urban-type settlements in Kamchatka Krai